Princess Stephanie of Windisch-Graetz (9 July 1909 in Ploskovice, Bohemia – 7 September 2005 in Uccle, Belgium) was the daughter of Prince Otto Weriand of Windisch-Graetz (1873–1952) and Archduchess Elisabeth Marie of Austria (1883–1963), only child of Crown Prince Rudolf of Austria and Princess Stéphanie of Belgium. She was the great-grandchild of Emperor Franz-Joseph and Empress Elisabeth ('Sissi') of Austria. She was also the great-grandchild of King Leopold II of Belgium.

Her full name was Stéphanie Eleonore Maria Elisabeth Kamilla Philomena Veronika zu Windisch-Grätz in German, and Stéphanie Éléonore Marie Élisabeth Camille Philomène Véronique de Windisch-Grätz in French. She may have been named after her maternal grandmother, Princess Stéphanie of Belgium. Her nickname in the family was Fée.

Parents' separation, effect on life
As a child she suffered greatly from her mother's frequent absences, and her parents' inharmonious marriage. The couple was separated in 1924 and divorced in 1948. Her mother came to live in Brussels with the four children and Princess Clementine of Belgium offered a friendly refuge to Stéphanie.

In 1921, Archduchess Elisabeth had begun a relationship with the Austrian socialist member of parliament Leopold Petznek, whom she eventually married in 1948.  Stéphanie got along well with her stepfather, but her relationship with her mother was not very good, and worsened after her second marriage.  Archduchess Elisabeth did not like Karl-Axel Björklund, and forbade him to be in her house. Stéphanie financially supported her father Otto Weriand in later life.

Stéphanie had three elder brothers:
 Prince Franz Joseph zu Windisch-Grätz (1904 in Prague – 1981 in Nairobi), married to Ghislaine d'Arschot Schoonhoven (1912–1997) and father of
 Princess Stéphanie Windisch-Graetz (1939–2019) became an artist, known for her photographic portraits using only candles as a source of light and for her sensual images from the animal world. She married Dermot Blundell-Hollinshead-Blundell (1935–2009) (a descendant of Nicholas Blundell). They are the parents of:
 Henry Victor William Blundell-Hollinshead-Blundell (born 1967) and
 Alexander Otto Blundell-Hollinshead-Blundell (born 1969), whose surname was changed to "de Windisch-Graetz" in Belgium in 2011.
 Prince Guillaume Franz Josef Maria Windisch-Graetz (born 1950; unmarried).
 Prince Ernst zu Windisch-Grätz (1905–1952)
 Prince Rudolf zu Windisch-Grätz (1907–1939)

First marriage
In 1933, Stéphanie married Count Pierre d'Alcantara de Querrieu (2 November 1907 – 14 October 1944). Count d'Alcantara was the son of Jean d'Alcantara de Querrieu and Baroness Marie-Lucie t'Kint de Roodenbeeke. Count d'Alcantara was a member of the household of King Leopold III. In 1942 he was arrested by the Gestapo and died two years later in the Sachsenhausen concentration camp. She had one child by her first husband:
 Count Alvar Etienne d'Alcantara de Querrieu (30 July 1935 – 5 August 2019)

Second marriage

In 1945, after the death of her husband, she married Karl-Axel Björklund (1906–1986). She had one child by her second husband:
 Bjorn-Axel Björklund (20 October 1944 – 7 September 1995)

Later life
During her long life, Stéphanie traveled extensively, especially in Africa, where her brother François-Joseph lived in Kenya, and also in South America, particularly in Argentina.

Ancestry

Sources
 Ghislaine Windisch-Graetz, née d'Arschot Schoonhoven, Kaiseradler und rote Nelke: Das Leben der Tochter des Kronprinzen Rudolf, 1988
 Friedrich Weissensteiner, L'Archiduchesse rouge, Payot, Paris, 2010
 Oscar Coomans de Brachène, Etat présent de la noblesse belge, annuaire 2003, Brussels, 2003.

Stephanie
Austrian princesses
Austrian expatriates in Belgium
1909 births
2005 deaths